Aidan Tuite (Irish: Aodhán de Tiúit) is an Irish Gaelic footballer who plays for Senior Football Championship team Skryne. He is currently the captain of the Skryne team, and on 26 September 2010 became the 13th Skryne captain to lift the Keegan Cup by leading Skryne to their 13th Meath Senior Football Championship.

Honours
Meath Senior Football Championship: 2
2004, 2010

References

1983 births
Living people
Quantity surveyors
Skryne Gaelic footballers